Margaret Hunt may refer to:

 Margaret Hunt (tennis) (born 1942), South African tennis player
 Margaret Hunt Brisbane (1858–1925), American poet
 Margaret Hunt Hill (1915–2007), American heiress and philanthropist
 Margaret Raine Hunt (1831–1912), British novelist and translator